Forever Endeavour is the 13th studio album by Canadian singer-songwriter Ron Sexsmith. It was published in February 2013 under Cooking Vinyl Records, and produced by Mitchell Froom.

The album won the Juno Award for Adult Alternative Album of the Year at the Juno Awards of 2014.

Track list

Personnel
 Calder Group - strings
 Matt Chamberlain - drums, percussion
 Davey Faragher - bass
 Mitchell Froom - keyboards
 Bob Glaub - bass
 Joshua Heapley - strings
 Don Heffington - drums, percussion
 Dan Higgins - woodwinds
 Charlene Huang - strings
 Hagai Izraeli - brass
 Greg Leisz - pedal steel
 Darrell Leonard - brass
 Val McCallum - electric guitar
 Joe Meyer - French horn
 Albert Romero - strings
 William Roper - tuba
 John Steinmetz - brass
 Lori Stuntz - tuba
 Pete Thomas - drums, percussion
 Michael Urbano - drums, percussion
 Ron Sexsmith - vocals, guitar

References

External links
Forever Endeavour by Ron Sexsmith at iTunes.com

2013 albums
Cooking Vinyl albums
Ron Sexsmith albums
Albums produced by Mitchell Froom
Juno Award for Adult Alternative Album of the Year albums